Adrushtavanthulu is a 1969 Telugu-language action drama film, produced by V. B. Rajendra Prasad under the Jagapathi Art Productions banner and is directed by V. Madhusudhana Rao. It stars Akkineni Nageswara Rao and Jayalalithaa, with music composed by K. V. Mahadevan. The film was remade as Tamil movie Thirudan, as Hindi movie Himmat (1970) and in Sinhalese as Edath Sooraya Adath Sooraya in 1972.

Plot
The film begins with Raghu (Akkineni Nageswara Rao), a notorious criminal being released from jail as a reformed person. Just before, Inspector Murthy (Gummadi) asserts that a criminal will never change when Raghu challenges to prove that his opinion as false. Soon after, Raghu's previous gangsters take him to their Boss (Jaggaiah), who gives a warm welcome which he rejects and makes him aware that right now, he wants to lead an honorable life. At that point, the Boss threatens Raghu, but he courageously confronts him and quits the place. Yet, the Boss covets to get hold of him because of his extraordinary talent. After that, Raghu gets acquainted with a mechanic Jackie (Padmanabham) and turns into a truck driver for survival. Once on a journey, Raghu and Jackie hit upon a beautiful girl Jaya (Jayalalitha) in male guise. Later, Raghu discovers the truth also find out that she fled from the house, so he forcibly takes her back. But unfortunately, Raghu notices his old associate Raju (Prabhakar Reddy) there, so, he immediately rescues her when both of them fall in love. Soon, they get married and the couple is blessed with a baby girl Baby (Baby Rani). Time passes, Raghu builds a jaunty world around him but his Boss and Inspector Murthy still chase him. Once Raghu disputes with a lender Dhanaratnam (Venkateswara Rao), exploiting it, the Boss slaughters the lender and indicts Raghu in the crime. Fortuitously, he has been acquitted as innocent. Further, the gangsters create a lot of adversities and Raghu could not bear the torment. During that plight, Jaya joins as a club dancer for livelihood. Spotting it, devastated Raghu decides to avenge against the society by getting back into his past life. Immediately, he meets Inspector Murthy and pleads him to give an opportunity to prove his integrity which he accepts. Thereafter, Raghu rejoins into the gang but the Boss senses his intention, so, he falsifies him by tangling, with coercive Raghu  makes a dangerous train robbery and steals a confidential document containing secrets of a nation. Here Raghu double-crosses the gang and secures the documents when the Boss takes Baby into his custody. At last, Raghu safeguards the documents and Baby by keeping his life at risk. Finally, the movie ends on a happy note by society accepting Raghu as a noble person.

Cast
Akkineni Nageswara Rao as Raghu
Jayalalitha as Jaya
Jaggayya as Boss
Gummadi as C.I. Inspector Murthy 
Relangi as Guest Role
Padmanabham as Jackie
Prabhakar Reddy as Raju
Tyagaraju as Police Inspector
Anand Mohan as Razzak
Geethanjali as Radha
Suryakantham as Pesaratla Peramma
Chhaya Devi as Pullatla Pullamma 
Vijaya Lalitha 
Baby Rani as Baby

Soundtrack

Music was composed by K. V. Mahadevan. Music was released on Audio Company.

References

External links
 

1969 films
1960s Telugu-language films
Indian drama films
Films directed by V. Madhusudhana Rao
Films scored by K. V. Mahadevan
Telugu films remade in other languages
1969 drama films